The Namal University is a private university in Rikhi, Mianwali District, Punjab, Pakistan.

Overview

The Institute is located on 30 km, Talagang Mianwali Road near Namal Lake. Initially, it was established as an affiliated college of the University of Bradford, UK. Later in 2019 Namal College acquired a DAI (Degree Awarding Institute) status and thus became Namal Institute. Imran Khan is the chairman of Board of Governors Namal Education Foundation which is the sponsoring body of Namal Knowledge City including this institute. The initial 40 kanal of land area for this institute was provided by a local resident Ghulam Muhammad Seelu. Now it has more than 1000 acres of land overlooking the Namal Lake. There are more than 300 students studying in this institute for whom more than 90% are on financial support.

Academic programs
The Institute offers following four-year degree programs:
 BSc (Hons) Computer Science
 BSc Electrical Engineering
 Bachelor of Business Administration (BBA)
 BSc (Hons) Mathematics

Academic partnerships
Namal Institute has a close  relationship with University of Mianwali and also an advisory relationship with Lahore University of Management Sciences (LUMS).

References

External links
 NAMAL official website

Universities and colleges in Mianwali District
Educational institutions established in 2008
2008 establishments in Pakistan
Engineering universities and colleges in Pakistan
Imran Khan